HMS Holmes (K581)  was a Royal Navy , originally a  intended for the United States Navy. Before she was finished in 1944, she was transferred to the Royal Navy under the terms of Lend-Lease, and was in commission from 1944 to 1945, seeing service during World War II.

Construction and transfer
The still-unnamed ship was laid down as the U.S. Navy destroyer escort DE-572 by Bethlehem-Hingham Shipyard, Inc., in Hingham, Massachusetts, on 27 October 1943. Allocated to the United Kingdom, she received the British name Holmes and was launched on 18 December 1943. She was transferred to the United Kingdom upon completion on 31 January 1944.

Service history

Commissioned into service in the Royal Navy as the frigate HMS Holmes (K581) on 31 January 1944 simultaneously with her transfer, the ship served on escort duty for the remainder of World War II. The Royal Navy returned her to the U.S. Navy on 3 December 1945.

Disposal
The U.S. Navy struck Holmes from its Naval Vessel Register on 7 February 1946. She was sold to Walter H. Wilms and Company of Detroit, Michigan, in October 1947 for scrapping.

References
 
 
 Navsource Online: Destroyer Escort Photo Archive DE-572 HMS Holmes (K-581)
 uboat.net HMS Holmes (K581)
 Destroyer Escort Sailors Association DEs for UK

External links

 Photo gallery of HMS Holmes (K581)

 

Captain-class frigates
Buckley-class destroyer escorts
World War II frigates of the United Kingdom
Ships built in Hingham, Massachusetts
1943 ships